Johann Philipp von Gebsattel (13 May 1555 – 26 June 1609) was the Prince-Bishop of Bamberg from 1599 to 1609.

Biography
Johann Philipp von Gebsattel was born on 13 May 1555. He was elected Prince-Bishop of Bamberg on 4 February 1599, with Pope Clement VIII confirming his appointment on 19 July 1599. He was never consecrated as a bishop and remained a deacon at the time of his death. He died on 26 June 1609, aged 54, and is buried in Michaelsberg Abbey, Bamberg. The abbey was dissolved in 1803.

See also

References

1555 births
1609 deaths
Prince-Bishops of Bamberg